is a shōnen manga and anime series by Fujiko A. Fujio named after its protagonist. The first series was broadcast on TBS from April 21, 1968 to March 23, 1969. The second series was broadcast on TV Asahi from September 2, 1980 to September 28, 1982. A live-action series was broadcast on Nippon Television and Yomiuri Television from April 17 to June 12, 2010. The 94-episode 1982 iteration was aired around the world, marketed as The Monster Kid, which was the official English title.

Plot
Kaibutsu-kun (Monster Kid) and his companions, Dracula, Wolfman, and Franken, travel from Monster Land to the Human Realm, where they encounter and battle several monsters, mainly assassins from the demon group Demonish. In India, the show was aired in Hindi where MK (Monster Kid) has a friend Hrithik who is not as fearless as MK himself. He calls Franken: Bheja, Dracula: Jojo and Wolfman: Chalbheja.

Cast
 - A little boy who can metamorph. Tarou resembles Sabu from the Perman Series. Tarou is also Kiteretsu's best friend from the Kiteretsu series
Voiced by: Fuyumi Shiraishi ('68), Masako Nozawa ('80)
 - Taro's friend, who lives with his sister Utako. 
Hrithik (Hindi Version)
Voiced by: Minori Matsushima ('68), Katsue Miwa ('80)
 - Hiroshi's older sister. Both are orphans who live in Arama-sō, a two-story Japanese apartment. She takes care of her brother. Caring and super-radiant forever.
Voiced by: Mariko Mukai ('68), Chiyoko Kawashima ('80)
 - He drinks tomato juice instead of human blood, and tends to put "damasu" at the end of every sentence. In the TV drama series, he often puts English phrases in every sentence.
Voiced by: Hiroshi Ohtake ('68), Kaneta Kimotsuki ('80)
 - The housekeeper and also a cook. He tends to put "gansu" at the end of every sentence.
Voiced by: Shingo Kanemoto ('68), Takuzou Kamiyama ('80)
 - Like his Hollywood counterpart, he's big, and not too smart.
Voiced by: Masao Imanishi ('68), Taro Sagami→ Shingo Kanemoto ('80)
 Taro's father and King of Monsterland.
Voiced by: Dai Kanai ('80)
 - Taro's girlfriend. She's super angry.
Voiced by: Eiko Masuyama ('68, '80)

Voiced by: Reizō Nomoto ('80)

Voiced by: Shigeru Chiba ('80)

Voiced by: Ken'ichi Ogata ('80)

Voiced by: Hiroshi Ohtake→ Shun Yashiro ('80)
 - Prince of the demons.
Voiced by: Eiko Yamada ('80)
 - Hiroshi's classmate and sorrowfully not girlfriend.
Voiced by: Keiko Han ('80)
 - Hiroshi's classmate whose name is similar to a character in Obake no Q-taro. But is otherwise good and forever sad. And Ako's not boyfriend.
Voiced by: Sanji Hase ('80)
 - Hiroshi's big classmate.
Voiced by: Kiyonobu Suzuki ('80)

Media

Television drama
A TV drama adaptation was aired on Nippon TV in 2010 with nine episodes. Two drama specials were aired after the initial airing of the drama series in June 2010, where the author of Kaibutsu-kun appears as a guest, and October 2011.

There are some differences between the anime and the live action series, especially for the setting and the characters. Neither Hiroshi's classmates in the anime appear in the TV drama series. The new characters are Wolfman's daughter, the landlady of Arama-sō and a policeman. The theme song for the TV drama series is Monster by Japanese boy band Arashi.

Plot
Kaibutsu-kun is a rambunctious prince of Kaibutsu Land. On the day of succession to the throne, he is ordered to go to the world of humans by the King of Kaibutsu Land for ascetic training. Kaibutsu-kun and his attendants, Dracula, Wolfman, and Franken, travel to the world of humans and encounter several monsters or humans belonging to the demon group led by Demorina who tries to set the prince of demon back on track and take over the world.

Main casts
Satoshi Ohno as Kaibutsu-kun
Norito Yashima as Dracula
Ryuhei Ueshima as Wolfman
Choi Hong-man as Franken
Umika Kawashima as Ichikawa Utako

Live-action film
A 3D movie titled  was released on November 26, 2011, directed by Yoshihiro Nakamura. It went on to be a commercial success in Japan and earned  ($39,766,344).

References

External links
 Official 2010 TV series website 
 Info on the 1980s series 
 

1965 manga
1968 anime television series debuts
1968 Japanese television series debuts
1969 Japanese television series endings
1980 anime television series debuts
1982 anime films
1980 Japanese television series debuts
1982 Japanese television series endings
2010 Japanese television series debuts
2010 Japanese television series endings
Animated television series about orphans
Japanese children's animated adventure television series
Japanese children's animated comedy television series
Japanese children's animated fantasy television series
Japanese children's animated horror television series
Adventure anime and manga
Anime series based on manga
Comedy anime and manga
Fantasy anime and manga
Fujiko Fujio A
Horror anime and manga
Japanese drama television series
Manga series
Nippon TV dramas
Shin-Ei Animation
Shōnen manga
TV Asahi original programming
TBS Television (Japan) original programming
Yomiuri Telecasting Corporation original programming
Shōnen Gahōsha manga
Japanese comedy films
Japanese horror films